Eastwood, Victoria is a residential suburb of Bairnsdale in the East Gippsland region of Victoria in Australia.

At the 2016 census Eastwood had a population of 2,766 people

References 

East Gippsland